This is a list of seasons played by Oțelul Galați in Romanian and European football, from 1964 to the present day. It details the club's achievements in major competitions, and the top scorers for each season.

Key

 P = Played
 W = Games won
 D = Games drawn
 L = Games lost
 F = Goals for
 A = Goals against
 Pts = Points
 Position = Final position

 2nd R = 2nd Round
 3rd R = 3rd Round
 4th R = 4th Round
 R 32 = Last 32 (5th Round)
 R 16 = Last 16
 QF = Quarter-finals
 SF = Semi-finals

Footnotes

Otelul Galati